Reese Palley (26 January 1922 – 3 June 2015) was an entrepreneur, gallerist, art dealer, author, and sailor.

Biography

Art gallerist and real estate dealings 
In 1957 he opened a gallery outside the Marlborough-Blenheim Hotel, selling Edward Marshall Boehm's porcelain figures of animals. From 1959 to 1979, he owned and operated Objet d'Art Galleries. In San Francisco, Palley restored the V.C. Morris Gift Shop at 140 Maiden Lane, the only example of a completed Frank Lloyd Wright building in San Francisco.

In 1976, Palley and a partner purchased the Marlborough-Blenheim for $6 million. They later rented it to Bally Manufacturing.

NJ Lottery Commission ethics violations 
In 1983, Palley was suspended as chairman of the New Jersey Lottery commission by Governor Thomas Kean after he was charged with falsifying documents in an attempt thwart an ethics investigation into his conflict of interest. The ethics committee found that Palley sought money from a company bidding on a contract for the Lottery Commission. He pled guilty to a single charge of conspiracy to fabricate evidence in 1985.

Lorenzo de Medici Painting 
He once purchased a painting for $2,600 that turned out to be one of the five lost paintings by Raphael, this one of Lorenzo de Medici. Believing the work to be a replica, Palley sold the artwork for $6,000 in 1964. After Palley sold the item, it was later authenticated as an original and auctioned at Christie's by a subsequent owner for $37.27 million in 2007.

Furnitureindex 
Palley with his wife, Marilyn Arnold Palley, created the Palley Index of Danish Furniture, 1900–2000 (now called the Furnitureindex), a compilation of over 12,000 works of Danish furniture of the 20th and 21st centuries.

Writing and alleged activities 
In his book Unlikely Passages, he made claims to many alleged feats, including starting an airline company, starting a mushroom farm in caves, opening a sewing machine needle factory in Russia, smuggling a sought-after Torah out of Odessa, escaping Ethiopian gunboats on the Red Sea, and discussing ideas to run an island government with Tristan Jones.

References

External links

Official website
Reese Palley 2DegreesCentigrade Blog

1922 births
2015 deaths
Circumnavigators of the globe
American sailors
American art dealers
American non-fiction writers